Martín Almagro Basch (11 April 1911 – 24 August 1984) was a Spanish archaeologist, historian, and writer. He fought in the Spanish civil war. He was an archaeology specialist, ranging from rock art to classic archaeology. He was a professor of early human history at the University of Madrid and Barcelona, and was Director of the Museo Arqueológico Nacional "MAN" de Madrid between 1968-1981. 
He directed the first Spanish archeological expedition in Egypt. His contribution in the transfer and rescue of several Egyptians temples was grateful by the Arab Republic with the concession of the Debod temple, actually in Madrid.

Biography 
Martín Almagro Basch was born in Tramacastilla. In childhood, he studied in the school of the Escolapios of Albarracín (Teruel), in 1928-1930 - in the University of Valencia and finally in the Central University of Madrid where he received his doctors degree and studied under Hugo Obermaier. He travelled to Germany where in 1930 he completed his studies.
 
In 1936, Martín Almagro Basch participated in Spanish Civil War and was listed as soldier in Falange Española de las JONS.

In 1939, Martín Almagro Basch was appointed director of the Museum of Archaeology in Barcelona. In 1940, he was the  chairman of the Ancient History of Spain in the University of Santiago, and in 1943, professor of Prehistory of the University of Barcelona.

Works
Introduction to Archaeology (1941)
Ampurias: History of the City and excavation guide (1951)
The necropolis of Ampurias (1955)
The Sovereign Lordship under Azagra Albarracin (1959)
Introduction to the study of prehistory and the field of archeology(1960)
Manual of Universal History. Prehistory (1960)
History of Albarracin and sierra (1959-1964)
The peninsular Southeast decorated trail (1966)
Prehistoric art in Spanish Sahara (1968)

Awards 
 Medal of Gold to the Merit in the Fine arts
 Civil Order of Alfonso X, the Wise
 Order of Civil Merit
 Cultural gold medal of the Republic of Italy 
 Palm of the Académie française

References

1911 births
1984 deaths
Complutense University of Madrid
People from Teruel
Spanish Falangists
Spanish military personnel of the Spanish Civil War (National faction)
20th-century archaeologists